The 1877–78 Scottish Cup – officially the Scottish Football Association Challenge Cup – was the fifth season of Scotland's most prestigious football knockout competition. For the first time, over 100 teams took part in the competition which began with the first round on 22 September 1877. The cup was won by Vale of Leven for a second time after they defeated Glasgow club 3rd Lanark RV 1–0 in the final on 30 March 1878.

Heart of Midlothian and Hibernian were drawn to face each other in the first round in what would be the first competitive Edinburgh derby. Hibernian won 2–1 after a replay.

Calendar

The exact dates of some matches are unknown as newspaper coverage of football in the late 19th century was not as comprehensive as it would become.

2 teams qualified for the second round after drawing their first round replay.
2 teams qualified for the third round after drawing their second round replay.
2 teams qualified for the fourth round after drawing their third round replay.
Barrhead were disqualified after winning their fourth round match against Partick, due to discrepancies in their third round match against Renfrew. Both Renfrew and Partick were reinstated.

Teams
All 116 teams entered the competition in the first round.

First round

Matches

Glasgow and Suburbs
Caledonian received a bye to the second round.

Renfrewshire district
17th Renfrew RV received a bye to the second round.

Lanarkshire district

Dunbartonshire district

Ayrshire district

Edinburgh district

Forfarshire district
Dunmore received a bye to the second round.

Galloway district

Stirlingshire district
Grasshoppers received a bye to the second round.

Replays

Glasgow and Suburbs

Renfrewshire district

Lanarkshire district

Ayrshire district

Edinburgh district

Notes

Sources:

Second round

Matches

Ayrshire and Dumfriesshire district

Forfarshire district

Dunbartonshire district
Renton Thistle received a bye to the third round.

Renfrewshire district
Barrhead received a bye to the third round.

Edinburgh district
Swifts received a bye to the third round.

Glasgow and Suburbs
Stonefield received a bye to the third round.

Lanarkshire district
Drumpellier received a bye to the third round.

Stirlingshire district

Replays

Ayrshire and Dumfriesshire district

Dunbartonshire district

Edinburgh district

Glasgow and Suburbs

Notes

Sources:

Third round

Matches

Glasgow and Suburbs

Lanarkshire district

Renfrewshire district

Dunbartonshire district

Ayrshire district
Kilbirnie received a bye to the fourth round.

Edinburgh district
St. Clement's received a bye to the fourth round.

Replays

Glasgow and Suburbs

Lanarkshire district

Renfrewshire district

Notes

Sources:

Fourth round
Jordanhill received a bye to the fifth round.

Matches

Replays

Notes

Sources:

Fifth round

Matches

Replay

Sources:

Quarter-finals

Matches

Replays

Sources:

Semi-finals
Vale of Leven received a bye to the final.

Match

Replay

Second Replay

Sources:

Final

See also
1877–78 in Scottish football

References

1877–78
Cup
Scot